Rick Pietri  (born July 6, 1965) is an American college basketball coach and the current women's head coach at Jacksonville State University in Jacksonville, Alabama. The Jacksonville State Gamecocks are members of the Ohio Valley Conference (OVC) and compete in the NCAA's Division I. The former head coach at the University of South Alabama was named as JSU's new coach on June 25, 2013.

Personal life
A graduate of DeLaSalle High School in New Orleans, Pietri has a bachelor's degree in communication and a master's degree in education from the University of South Alabama (USA). He is married to the former Suzanne Odom of Mobile, Alabama, and they are the parents of two.

Coaching career
After graduating from South Alabama, where he was manager of the men's basketball team from 1983–87, Pietri began his coaching career as an assistant at St. Paul's High School in Covington, Louisiana. He then spent four years as an assistant with the men's team at Spring Hill College in Mobile before moving to Birmingham and one season as an assistant for Birmingham-Southern College's successful men's NAIA program.

Pietri then became the boys' basketball head coach at B.C. Rain High School in Mobile, directing his team to the Alabama Final Four four years in a row, including the Alabama Class 5A state championship in 1997. After two season as boys' coach at St. Paul's High School in Mobile, Pieri was named women's coach at South Alabama, taking over leadership of a program that had gone through ten consecutive losing seasons.

In thirteen seasons at South Alabama, Pietri's Lady Jaguars had nine winning seasons, won the West division of the Sun Belt Conference twice and made two appearances in the Women's National Invitation Tournament. With a record of 220–167 and 111–104 in the Sun Belt, Pietri is the winningest coach in US women's basketball. On March 13, 2013, Pietri was fired.

In his first year at Jacksonville State, Pietri led a program that had gone 5–52 (2–30 OVC) in its previous two years to a record of 14–18 (8–8 OVC) and a semi-final finish in the Ohio Valley Conference Tournament. He was also named 2013–14 Ohio Valley Conference Coach of the Year.

Head Coaching Record
Source:

 OVC 2017-18 Women's Basketball Standings

References

External links
 JSU website
 JSU Gamecocks website

1965 births
Living people
American women's basketball coaches
High school basketball coaches in the United States
Jacksonville State Gamecocks women's basketball coaches
South Alabama Jaguars women's basketball coaches
University of South Alabama alumni